The AFC U-16 Women's Championship 2009 was the 3rd instance of the AFC U-16 Women's Championship. It was held from November 4 to 15 in Bangkok, Thailand. The top 3 teams qualified for 2010 FIFA U-17 Women's World Cup.

Qualification

Seeding

Group stage 
The draw for the AFC U-16 Women's Championship 2009 took place in Bangkok on February 27, 2009.

Group A

Group B

Semi-finals

Third-place play-off

Final

See also 
AFC U-19 Women's Championship 2009

References

External links 
 Official site

AFC
Women
2009
2009 in Thai football
2009 AFC U-16 Women's Championship
2009 in youth association football
November 2009 sports events in Thailand